The 1900 VFL season was the Geelong Football Club's fourth season in the Victorian Football League and its second with Peter Burns as captain.

Geelong finished the home and away with 9 wins and 5 losses, finishing in second position. In the final series, Geelong finished with 2 wins and 1 loss, finishing in second position on the Section B Ladder. Geelong failed to qualify for the Grand Final.

The leading goalkicker was Teddy Lockwood with 24 goals.

Playing List 
Only three players played in all 17 matches this season, with a total of 31 players being used. Teddy Lockwood was the leading goalkicker with 24 this season. Five players reached the 50 game milestone.

Statistics

Season Summary 
Geelong were again competitive this season finishing with a 9-5 record in the home-and-away season.

Results

Ladder

Section B Ladder

References

Geelong Football Club seasons
1900 in Australian rules football